ESCP can refer to:
ESCP, École Supérieure de Commerce de Paris, a private French business school

Science
European Scientific Cooperative on Phytotherapy (ESCOP acronym short-name);
European Society for Cognitive Psychology (ESCoP), ignores "for", Co = "Cognitive".